Yakisugi (焼杉) is a traditional Japanese method of wood preservation.  It is referred to in the West as burnt timber cladding and is also available as shou sugi ban or 焼杉板, a trademark which uses the same kanji characters but an incorrect pronunciation. The ban character means "plank".

By slightly charring the surface of the wood without combusting the whole piece, the wood becomes water-proof through the carbonisation and is thus more durable. It also protects against insects, as well as making the wood fire retardant.

Examples
Contemporary architect  Terunobu Fujimori  works with yakisugi.

References

External links 
 

Housing in Japan
Woodworking